Okie Baroque is an EP by American indie rock band Blackpool Lights. After touring to support their 2006 debut album This Town's Disaster, the band dissolved in 2008 for unknown reasons. In early 2010 after the reunion of lead singer Jim Suptic's other band The Get Up Kids, it was announced on Twitter that Blackpool Lights had reunited and was recording new material. The album was released online on November 30, 2010.

Track listing

Personnel

Band
Jim Suptic – guitar, vocals
Billy Brimblecom – drums

Production
Steve Wilson – production mastering

References

Blackpool Lights albums
2010 albums